Austin Macauley Publishers Limited is a British publishing company, with offices in London, New York and Sharjah. The company was founded in 2006 and publishes fiction and non-fiction books. It publishes new and established authors. The company publishes books in English and Arabic languages.

Business model
The company operates what it calls a 'hybrid' publishing model, claiming to offer some 'traditional' contracts to prospective authors as well as 'contributory' contracts, in which the author pays a part of the publication cost.

Published authors 
Authors published by the company have included:

 Austin Stevens
 Carey Blyton
 Tariq Anwar
 Javaid Laghari
Maryam Saqer Al Qasimi
Ira David Wood III
Lawrence Salander
Oliver Friggieri
Bonita Lawrence
Simon May
Claire Liddell
Kevin Lueshing
Alexander Matthews

Recognition 
Publishers Weekly named Austin Macauley one of the fastest growing independent publishers in 2018.

Their International Publishing Director is Jade Robertson. She was also listed among 'The 30 Most Influential Women in the Arab World 2019.'

Affiliations 
Associated with Independent Publishers Guild (IPG) Austin Macauley Publishers is a member of The Publishers Association.

Controversy 
Austin Macauley appears on the Science Fiction and Fantasy Writers of America 'Thumbs Down' Publishers List, which, according to the association, contains the companies ''about which [they] have received the largest number of complaints over the years, or which [they] consider to pose the most significant hazard for writers".

Austin Macauley was the company most often mentioned in "comments made by writers about misrepresentation and lack of transparency in the way some ‘hybrid’ / paid-for publishing companies promoted their publishing services" in a survey of their members by the Writers Guild of Great Britain (WGGB) and the Society of Authors (SoA). In an analysis of Austin Macauley's websites and available marketing presence the survey report, entitled "Is it a steal?", said that the company "adopted an opaque approach to promoting their services ... [T]here was no indication at the time of review (October 2021) in Austin Macauley’s advertising, in its advertising landing pages, or in its active submissions pages, that it will charge a writer. ... It also referred to authors paying ‘a small proportion’ of the cost of publication, but all the Austin Macauley contracts seen by the SoA and WGGB asked writers to pay more than it would cost to self-publish the work, even with the assistance of legitimate self-publishing services". Regarding the industry as a whole the report said that "the average loss for a writer in a ‘hybrid’/paid-for publishing deal was £1,861, with some participants reporting losses as high as £9,900", while "[a] median of only 67 books were sold per deal, resulting in royalties of only £68".

References

External links
Official websites
 Austin Macauley Publishers UK
 Austin Macauley Publishers USA
 Austin Macauley Publishers UAE

Companies based in the London Borough of Tower Hamlets
Publishing companies of the United Kingdom
2006 establishments in England